Scottish records in swimming are ratified by Scotland's governing body in swimming, Scottish Swimming. Records can be set in long course (50 metres) or short course (25 metres) swimming pools, with records currently recorded in the following events for both men and women.
Freestyle: 50 m, 100 m, 200 m, 400 m, 800 m, 1500 m
Backstroke: 50 m, 100 m, 200 m
Breaststroke: 50 m, 100 m, 200 m
Butterfly: 50 m, 100 m, 200 m
Individual medley: 100 m (short course only), 200 m, 400 m
Relays: 4×50 m freestyle (short course only), 4 × 100 m freestyle, 4 × 200 m freestyle, 4×50 m freestyle (short course only), 4 × 100 m medley
Records can be set at intermediate distances in an individual race and for the first leg of a relay race.

The ratification process and involves submission of an application by the swimmer to Scottish Swimming detailing the name(s) of the swimmer, time swum, date and location of the swim, names of officials and the swimsuit model worn. Upon ratification, the records appear on the official records listing. Records which have not yet been fully ratified are marked with a '#' symbol in these lists, and all records were achieved in finals unless otherwise noted.

Long course (50 m)

Men

Women

Mixed relay

Short course (25 m)

Men

Women

Mixed relay

Notes

Gallery
Some of the current Scottish record holders:

References
General
Scottish Long Course records 3 March 2023 updated
Scottish Short Course records 20 January 2023 updated
Specific

External links
Scottish Swimming official website
Scottish Swimming records page

Scottish
Swimming
Records
Swimming records